Noel Bishop (born 12 February 1948) is a former Australian rules footballer who played with Carlton in the Victorian Football League (VFL).

Notes

External links 

Noel Bishop's profile at Blueseum

1948 births
Carlton Football Club players
Maryborough Football Club players
Australian rules footballers from Victoria (Australia)
Living people